The Minnesota State Fair is the state fair of the U.S. state of Minnesota. Also known by its slogan, "The Great Minnesota Get-Together", it is the largest state fair in the United States by average daily attendance and the second-largest state fair in the United States by total attendance, trailing only the State Fair of Texas, which generally runs twice as long as the Minnesota State Fair. The state fairgrounds, adjacent the Saint Paul campus of the University of Minnesota, are in Falcon Heights, Minnesota, midway between the state's capital city of Saint Paul and the adjacent city of Roseville, near the Como Park and Saint Anthony Park neighborhoods of Saint Paul. Residents of the state and region come to the fair to be entertained, exhibit their best livestock, show off their abilities in a variety of fields including art and cooking, learn about new products and services, and eat many different types of food—often on a stick. The Minnesota State Fair was named the best state fair in the United States in 2015 by readers of USA Today.

The fair runs for twelve days from late August into early September, ending on Labor Day. Around two million people attend the fair annually. Attendance in 2019 was a record 2,126,551 people. The highest daily attendance in the history of the fair was 270,426 visitors on Saturday, September 1, 2018.

History

Minnesota Territory first held a Territorial Fair in 1854, although the first Minnesota State Fair didn't occur until 1859, the year after statehood. 
In its early years during the 19th century, the fair was held in many different locations. Some were not far from the current site, but others were held in Greater Minnesota, including years where it was held in Rochester, Owatonna, and Winona. For a time in the 1870s, the Twin Cities of Minneapolis and St. Paul held competing fairs. Minneapolis, the younger city of the pair, eventually outdid its neighbor by staging the larger fair with the help of William S. King.
In 1884, a committee was put together by the Minnesota State Agricultural Society to select a permanent site. One site that was considered was an area around Minnehaha Falls, but the final site chosen was the Ramsey County Poor Farm, the fair's current site. It was a politically neutral site, being about halfway between Minneapolis and St. Paul. The fair first opened its doors there on September 7, 1885.

One of the first annual events to occur is the creation of a butter sculpture. Each year, a new Princess Kay of the Milky Way is selected to promote Minnesota's dairy industry. Part of the job involves posing for several hours in a walk-in, glass-walled refrigerator as a  block of butter is carved into a head with her likeness. Butter makers started sculpting their products at the fair as far back as 1898, although the head-sculpting tradition did not begin until 1964.

The main entrance to the fair from Snelling Avenue heads onto a road named Dan Patch Avenue for a pacer horse who won every race he ran in from 1900 to 1909 when he was retired.

In 1898 the Spanish American War broke out.  The states were requested to provide volunteers and Minnesota quickly had enough to form four Regiments.  They were initially numbered 1–4, but GAR veterans felt that they should continue the numbering from the Civil War and they became the 12th–15th Minnesota Infantry Regiments.  All four were mustered and organized on the State Fair Grounds.   Camp Ramsey on Machinery Hill was the encampment site.

One of the most significant dates in the fair's history was September 2, 1901, when then-Vice President Theodore Roosevelt was visiting and first uttered the famous phrase, "Speak softly and carry a big stick." Roosevelt became president just 12 days later, after William McKinley was assassinated. In 1925, the Minnesota State Fair was the site of the Norse-American Centennial celebration. During his appearance at the Norse-American Centennial, President Calvin Coolidge gave recognition to the contributions of Scandinavian-Americans and noted Leif Erikson as the discoverer of America.

In 1967, attendance was well over a million people and the record day that year was about 197,000 visitors. By 2016, attendance neared 2 million and the record day was about a quarter-million people.

2018 was another record year for the Fair. The overall attendance record of 2,046,533 was set along with an all-time single-day attendance record of 270,426 on the second Saturday.

Cancellations
Since 1859, the fair has run annually except for six different years. In 1861 and 1862, the fair was not held because of the Civil War and the Dakota War of 1862. Scheduling issues between the fair and the World's Columbian Exposition in Chicago, Illinois caused the 1893 fair to be cancelled. The fair was not held in 1945, as fuel was in short supply due to World War II and it was again cancelled in 1946 because of an outbreak of polio.

The fair was most recently cancelled in 2020, this time due to the COVID-19 pandemic with the decision announced on May 22, 2020. Fair Manager, Jerry Hammer, had previously stated that the 2020 fair would not be a postponed or scaled-back event; it would either run unchanged or be cancelled. Of the decision to cancel, Hammer stated "this is the time of year when things really need to take off, and we can't do it. There's not time." Instead, a food parade featuring several well-known State Fair vendors was held on several dates in October.

To make up for 2020's cancellation, the fair management hosted its first-ever spring event entitled "Kickoff To Summer" featuring scaled-back concessions and attractions. It also served as a test to the fair's eventual return in 2021. The "Kickoff to Summer" event returned in 2022 after positive reception in 2021.

Attractions

Livestock
A large portion of the Fairgrounds are occupied by livestock barns where various farm animals are displayed.  The animals and their owners take part in livestock shows to compete for awards.  Most of the shows take place in the coliseum, a large indoor arena on the fairgrounds. The Coliseum was constructed to replace the Hippodrome, which was rendered structurally unsound during its use as a Propeller Plant by the A.O. Smith Corporation during WWII and razed in 1946, and was completed for use in the 1951 fair.  Open class livestock competitions are held in horses, beef cattle, dairy cattle, swine, sheep, dairy goats, llamas, poultry (chickens, ducks, geese, turkeys, pigeons) rabbits, and stock dogs. On August 31, 2007, a bull escaped from its handler charging several fairgoers before fatally injuring itself charging a fire hydrant. No people were seriously injured in the mishap.

Food

Foods served at the annual Minnesota State Fair have traditionally included watermelon pickles, baked beans, buffalo burgers, deep-fried cheese curds, cotton candy, glazed ham, Australian battered potatoes  and homemade apple pie. Some foods reflect Minnesota's agriculture, including cheese curds, milk shakes, and corn dogs.

Many foods at the fair are deep-fried or come on a stick, from the classic corn dog to alligator-on-a-stick, lobster-on-a-stick, and deep-fried candy bar on a stick. New to the fair in 2006 was hotdish on a stick, a variant of a classic staple of Minnesotan cuisine. Another staple of the state fair is “Sweet Martha’s Cookies,” a stand that serves fresh and warm chocolate chip cookies in buckets.

In 2018, 27 new foods were introduced to the Minnesota State Fair including Firecracker Shrimp Stuffed Avocado, Honey Cream Soda Float, Mangonada Shaved Ice, Messy Giuseppe, Nordic Waffles, Smoked Soft Serve Ice Cream, and the UpNorth Puff Pastry. New foods for 2019 included fried tacos on a stick, stuffed cabbage rolls, feta bites, shrimp and grits fritters, blueberry key lime pie, Buffalo chicken chimichanga and assorted other dessert selections.

Machinery Hill/The North End
Machinery Hill is a large area of the fairgrounds. For several decades, it held the largest annual display of farm equipment in the world, with many companies showing off tractors, combines, and various attachments. However, modern displays generally focus on cars, trucks, lawn mowers, hot tubs and recreational machines like motorbikes.  Farm implement dealers tend to direct their efforts to more targeted "farm shows," abandoning the State Fair to more urban or suburban types of exhibitors. Machinery Hill also contains an interactive exhibit for kids called Little Farm Hands. In this exhibit, children get to experience life on the farm from planting seeds to selling goods at the farmers market.

Machinery Hill is gradually being rebranded as "The North End." In 2019, a new main entrance gate was created in addition to the new North End Event Center, which hosts traveling events and expositions. Its 2019 inaugural event was ANGRY BIRDS UNIVERSE: THE EXHIBITION.

Shows

The State Fair hosts concerts, comedy shows, product demonstrations, the State Fair Talent Contest and other shows. The Grandstand is a large outdoor concert hall that also features three floors of interior exhibition space. It hosts the largest of the fair's concerts and until 2002 was also the site of stock car races run on a small oval track. In 2003 the facility completed the first phase of a $35 million remodeling project that removed large sections of bleachers and increased seating capacity to 17,000. Most local television and radio stations set up temporary studios at the State Fair in their permanent buildings or booths. In 2012 the fair began holding the Walker Art Center's Internet Cat Video Festival in the grandstand.  Fairgoers watch the year's most popular cat videos and memes and award the best videos with cat trophies, the most prized being the Golden Kitty. Guest appearances have included Grumpy Cat and Lil Bub, two internet stars, as well as the creator of Nyan Cat, Christopher Torres.

Art

The fair displays an annual art exhibition that is the result of a juried competition of works of fine art.  Media include watercolor, oil, and acrylic paintings, photographs, sculptures, pastels, ceramics, glass, and textiles.  Entrants must be living residents of the state. In 2010, a total of 2,330 pieces were submitted, and 413 works were accepted.

One unusual display at the fair consists of the entrants in the crop art competition.  The artwork must be made of plant matter (seeds, stems, flowers, fruit, etc.) suitable for growing in Minnesota. For decades the display was dominated by Owatonna native Lillian Colton (1912–2007), who created seed portraits, professionally, having effectively captured scores of celebrities such as Ernest Hemingway, Barbra Streisand, Franklin D. Roosevelt, Prince, Princess Diana, and Willie Nelson in her crop art.  After winning nine purple ribbons, she stopped competing, but continued displaying her work at the fair.
 
There are competitions in dozens of categories in needlecraft, garment-making, wood-working, models, painting, doll-making, taxidermy, stamp-collecting, scrapbooking, baking, canning, and others.

Milk run
The annual 5 km run begins on the fairgrounds, winds its way through the Saint Paul campus of the University of Minnesota and the Saint Anthony Park neighborhood, and ends back at the fairgrounds.

4-H
4-H has a significant presence at the fair, both in the 4-H Building and in the animal barns and arenas.  Contests include herdsmanship, horse showmanship, judging teams, public presentations and county club exhibits. Livestock displays include beef and dairy cattle, dairy and market goats, poultry (chickens, ducks, geese, turkeys, and pigeons), rabbits, Domestic sheep, and swine. About half of all 4-H projects entered are animal science projects. The 4-H building was opened and dedicated in 1939 and about 320,000 state fairgoers visit it every year. The non-livestock projects include photography, performing arts, crafts, food & nutrition, and clothing & textiles.

Science
In recent years the Progress Center has been housing the Eco Experience exhibit, which features activities and exhibits including the design and construction of an eco-friendly house, a rain garden, exhibits addressing climate change, energy conservation, renewable energy, biodiesel fuel and vehicles, and organic farming. The exhibit has received awards from the Western Fair Association, the International Associate of Fairs and Expositions, and the Minnesota Environmental Initiative.

State Fair Carousel
In 1913 Austin McFadden, a Michigan entrepreneur approached the Fair about building the first roller coaster on the Fair grounds and was turned down. The next year he was back and offered to throw in a Merry-go-round to get the Fair Board's approval. They did.  For the price of $8,500 McFadden got 30 tons of wood and steel decorated with 68 hand carved horses, 2 chariots and an organ from the Philadelphia Toboggan Company.  The Carousel became a State Fair institution that all of Minnesota thought belonged to the fair grounds.  It had no sign on it indicating its ownership was not public while being installed on public land.  Without any disclosure in 1988 the Fair's board refused to extend the Carousel's lease.  The public learned the owners had dismantled the Carousel and sent it to auction in New York.  The price wanted was $1.1 million.  The idea that the State Fair Carousel would be lost to Minnesota prompted a public effort to save it.  While not at the Fair grounds, today it remains intact at Como Park close by.  It is now named for the largest contributor to its remaining in Minnesota, Gerard Cafesjian.

Entertainment

Music
Every year there are many musical venues. The Grandstand, with a capacity of up to 17,000, has featured Alabama, Christina Aguilera, the Backstreet Boys, Bob Dylan, Boston, Diana Ross, Sheryl Crow, Foreigner, Aretha Franklin, Def Leppard, Journey, KISS, Lynyrd Skynyrd, Demi Lovato, Tim McGraw, The Beach Boys, The Temptations, Mötley Crüe, REO Speedwagon, Rush, Santana, Blake Shelton, Styx, James Taylor, Carrie Underwood, "Weird Al" Yankovic, John Mellencamp, and Usher, featuring Lil Jon.

There are also many free entertainment venues with local bands and a selection of national acts. Entertainment stages include the Leinie Lodge Bandshell, the Schell's Stage at Schilling Amphitheater, and the International Bazaar Stage.  In 2010, Boyz II Men performed two nights at one of the free venues.

Permanent rides
There are several rides that are permanent fixtures at the fair, including the Giant Slide, on which fairgoers ride down a large fiberglass slide on burlap sacks. The Skyride is an aerial lift ride that carries fairgoers across the grounds in a gondola.  The Space Tower is a gyro tower that rotates as it lifts people over 300 feet (90 m) in the air, giving views of the Minneapolis/St. Paul area.  There is also a haunted house which has been around since 1977 and is located on Judson Ave. The fair's oldest existing ride, Ye Old Mill (opened in 1915), is located near the food building. It is a "tunnel of love"-style ride for all ages.

Temporary rides

The Midway is a carnival-like setting that contains most of the rides at the State Fair.  The attractions include several funhouses, roller coasters and other thrill rides as well as numerous games of skill. It is located across the street from the Midway, but is not a part of it. Kidway is the carnival area on the fairgrounds geared toward children. Kidway is located between Dan Patch and Wright Avenues on the north end of the fairgrounds.

Management
The Minnesota State Fair is a state government-related entity that is operated by the Minnesota State Agricultural Society. The management of the fair is handled by the board of managers. The state fair has not accepted governmental funds since 1949. Revenue from the fair is reinvested into maintenance and the next year's fair.

The Minnesota State Fair Foundation is an organization that works to improve and preserves historic state fair buildings. The foundation is a 501(c)3 organization, and also supports State Fair agricultural, scientific and educational programs.  The foundation provided funding for the new Miracle of Birth center.

The Fair employs about 80 full-time staff members for the entire year; in the summer, some 400 seasonal staff are hired. During the fair time, around 3,000 temporary employees are hired.

Police Department
The State Fair area was policed by the Minnesota State Fair Police Department. The Chief of Police is Paul Paulos, appointed in 2018, who replaced Art Blakely, who had been chief for 37 years. Their authority is given by section 37.20 of the Minnesota Statutes. In 2020, 37 police officers were dismissed and required to re-apply for their positions, requiring a college degree which a number of longer-serving officers did not have, prompting a lawsuit against the State Fair on the grounds of age discrimination. For the first time ever, in 2021, the Ramsey County Sheriff's Office provided security at the fair in place of the State Fair P.D.

J. V. Bailey House

The J. V. Bailey House, at 1263 Cosgrove Street, is one of the oldest buildings on the fairgrounds. It was built in 1911 and restoration was completed in 2006. It is connected to the greenhouses and was occupied year-round by the greenhouse superintendent until 2004. The State Fair Foundation operates out of the residence.

Mascots
The fair's mascots are two anthropomorphized gophers. The choice of gopher as mascots was an homage to the University of Minnesota mascot which is also a gopher and was a historical reference to the expansion of railroads in Minnesota, towns popping up across the state like gophers. For these reasons, Minnesota is sometimes referred to as the gopher state. Fairchild, the original mascot, was suggested in a statewide contest by Gladys Anderson Brown in 1966 in honor of Henry S. Fairchild who advocated using the former Ramsey County Poor Farm as the permanent site of the fair. Dressed like an early barker on the midway with a straw hat and striped jacket, Fairchild has represented the fair since 1966. In 1986, he was joined on promotional materials by his nephew, Fairborne.

Attendance records

Off-season use

The fairgrounds host several events throughout the year. Events include horse shows in the Coliseum and Horse Barn, the Minnesota Horse Expo and the Minnesota Beef Expo, gymnastics meets and other sporting events, dog shows, antique and hot-rod car shows, motorcycle shows, model railroad shows, clothing and jewelry shows, gun and weapon collectors shows, comic book conventions, flea markets and swap meets, and more. Buildings on the grounds are frequently rented for commercial events such as appliance sales, computer and electronics sales, and boat and car sales. Earlier in the summer, some of the fairground's roads are used to host an annual series of bike races during the week, called the State Fair Affair Criterium Series. Many buildings on the fair grounds are rented for winter storage of boats, camping trailers, and similar equipment.

Gallery

References

External links

Minnesota State Fair: Origins and Traditions in MNopedia, the Minnesota Encyclopedia 
Minnesota State Fair
Minnesota State Fair Foundation

 
History of Minnesota
State fairs
Festivals in Minnesota
August events
September events
Recurring events established in 1859
Tourist attractions in Ramsey County, Minnesota
Buildings and structures in Ramsey County, Minnesota